Hoverter and Sholl Box Huckleberry Natural Area is a  natural area in Perry County, Pennsylvania, near New Bloomfield, which protects a colony of box huckleberry over 1,000 years old. The smallest Natural Area in Pennsylvania, it is administered as part of Tuscarora State Forest.  It was designated a National Natural Landmark in April 1967.

Topography
A  path forms a loop around the site, which is located on the west side of a hill slope. Twenty-seven interpretive stations are located along the trail. In addition to the low growth of the box huckleberry itself, the hillside is covered with white pine and oak forest, with a scattering of other trees and various wildflowers.

History
The specimen of box huckleberry at the natural area has been estimated, based on its observed rate of growth and clonal reproduction, to be 1,200 to 1,300 years old, only a tenth of the estimated age for a nearby colony at Losh Run. The colony was discovered by Spencer Baird in 1845. No specimens of box huckleberry had been collected since 1805, and Baird's discovery allowed Asa Gray to classify the species as Gaylussacia brachycera. The resulting correspondence sparked a lifelong friendship between the two, and helped Baird attain a post at the Smithsonian Institution.

The box huckleberry remained largely obscure until 1918, when Frederick V. Coville examined the site. On the basis of his observations there, he concluded that box huckleberry was self-sterile and spread clonally. After commercial nurserymen removed a truckload of plants from the site, Coville called attention to its plight with an article in Science. Renewed interest sparked the discovery of other box huckleberry colonies elsewhere in the Appalachians.

References

External links
Natural & Wild Areas of the Tuscarora State Forest, Pennsylvania Department of Conservation and Natural Resources

National Natural Landmarks in Pennsylvania
Protected areas of Perry County, Pennsylvania
Protected areas established in 1967
1967 establishments in Pennsylvania